The German submarine U-6 was a long-lived but very inactive Type IIA U-boat built before World War II for service in Nazi Germany's Kriegsmarine.

As she was one of the first batch of boats built following the renunciation of the Treaty of Versailles, she was capable of only coastal and short cruising work. This led to her being reassigned to training duties after the Norwegian campaign in 1940.

Design
U-6 had a displacement of  when at the surface and  while submerged. She had two shafts and two  propellers.

U-6 was fitted with three  torpedo tubes at the bow, five torpedoes or up to twelve Type A torpedo mines, and a  anti-aircraft gun. The boat had a complement of 25.

Service history

Built at Kiel in 1935, U-6 was a prestigious position for a captain in the Kriegsmarine during the years running up to the war, her commanders were all First World War veterans. On 31 August 1939, before the outbreak of World War II, the U-6 spotted three destroyers of the Polish Navy, the Burza, Błyskawica, and Grom, executing Peking Plan, on their way to Great Britain, but no action was undertaken. However, once war began, it was painfully clear that U-6 and her sisters were not capable of competing with other nations' larger and faster boats, and so after an initial patrol in the Baltic Sea, U-6 was not deployed again until March 1940, when every ship available to the Kriegsmarine was sent to support the invasion of Norway. During the month-long campaign, U-6s sister boats suffered numerous losses, and gained a reputation as something of a liability, which led them to be withdrawn to a training squadron in the Baltic for the remainder of the war.

In the Baltic, U-6 trained officer cadets in the skills needed to fight in the Battle of the Atlantic. Some of her patrols even verged on Soviet territory following Operation Barbarossa but, unlike some of her sister boats, U-6 never found a target on these missions. In the summer of 1944, with fuel and resources in short supply and the reputation of the Type II boats plummeting following a number of fatal accidents, U-6 was removed from service and laid up at Gotenhafen with a skeleton crew to perform maintenance. There she remained until May 1945, when a demolition team blew her up at her berth to prevent her falling into enemy hands.

References

Bibliography

External links
 

German Type II submarines
U-boats commissioned in 1935
World War II submarines of Germany
1935 ships
Ships built in Kiel